The 2021–22 season was the 115th season in the existence of Spezia Calcio and the club's second consecutive season in the top flight of Italian football. In addition to the domestic league, Spezia participated in this season's edition of the Coppa Italia.

Season overview
On 5 July 2021, Thiago Motta was appointed head coach, replacing Vincenzo Italiano who had left for Fiorentina.

On 16 July, Spezia were banned from four transfer windows, starting in January 2022, after breaching FIFA rules on signing minors. The club were also fined 500,000 Swiss francs ($543,832) for the offense.

On 28 June 2022, Motta left Spezia by mutual agreement.

Players

First-team squad

Out on loan

Transfers and loans

Transfers in

Pre-season and friendlies

Spezia announced a squad of 24 players to take part in pre-season training, beginning on 12 July 2021.

Competitions

Overall record

Serie A

League table

Results summary

Results by round

Matches
The league fixtures were announced on 14 July 2021.

Coppa Italia

Statistics

Appearances and goals

|-
! colspan=14 style=background:#dcdcdc; text-align:center"| Goalkeepers

|-
! colspan=14 style=background:#dcdcdc; text-align:center"| Defenders

|-
! colspan=14 style=background:#dcdcdc; text-align:center"| Midfielders

|-
! colspan=14 style=background:#dcdcdc; text-align:center"| Forwards

|-
! colspan=14 style=background:#dcdcdc; text-align:center"| Players transferred out during the season

References

Spezia Calcio seasons
Spezia